Creswick Jenkinson was an Australian writer, producer and director. As a screenwriter, he wrote the film Captain Thunderbolt (1953) as well as episodes of the TV series Skippy the Bush Kangaroo, Autumn Affair and Motel.

Adaptations 
Jenkinson adapted a number of works for the stage, including the version of The Imaginary Invalid by Molière which was performed by Peter Finch and the Mercury Mobile Players in 1948. This production was seen by Laurence Olivier and Vivien Leigh and led to Olivier inviting Finch to Australia.

Radio career 
He also worked extensively in radio, including as producer and writer on The Black Museum radio series starring Orson Welles, creator of the drama series Address Unknown, and as a producer for the radio program AM.

Select credits
Imaginary Invalid
The Pickwick Papers (1948) – play
Willow Bend (1951) – radio serial
Too Young to Die (1963) – radio serial

References

External links

Creswick Jenkinson at AusStage
Creswick Jenkinson at National Film and Sound Archive

Australian writers
Living people
Year of birth missing (living people)